Athletic Club Femenino B is a Spanish women's association football team based in Bilbao, in the autonomous community of the Basque Country, Spain.

Founded in 2002, it is the reserve team of Athletic Club Femenino, and currently plays in the Primera Federación, playing their home matches at the Lezama Facilities.

Reserve teams in Spain play in the same league system as the senior team, rather than in a reserve team league. They must play at least one level below their main side, and thus Athletic B are ineligible for promotion to the Primera División and cannot play in the Copa de la Reina.

History
In 2002, Athletic Bilbao introduced a women's section to their football activities in, absorbing a local club Leioa EFT. At the same time they introduced a women's reserve team (which had been established by Leioa the previous year) with the aim of developing players for the senior side.

After a single season in the Basque provincial league, the B-team was promoted to the second tier – then known as the Primera Nacional – where they have remained since, winning their regional group in the competition four times (most recently in 2017) but being ineligible for promotion.

Athletic B, whose players are usually between 16 and 21 years of age, are also regular participants in the Copa Vasca, a regional tournament for lower-league teams, and have won the trophy six times.

Below the reserve level Athletic have a C-team, introduced in 2019 and quickly promoted to the Basque provincial league, and a girls' cadet (under-15) team, introduced in 2017 and competing at local youth level. In common with all other teams fielded by the club, only players who meet their recruitment policy of having a connection to the 'greater Basque Country' are eligible to join.

Season to season

As Leioa EFT B

As Athletic Club B

Notable graduates
  
Note: this list contains players who have appeared in at least 50 games for the first team or another top-level club. Current players in bold.

References

External links

Athletic Club B at Txapeldunak

Spanish reserve football teams
Association football clubs established in 2002
2002 establishments in Spain
Football clubs in the Basque Country (autonomous community)
Women's football clubs in Spain
Athletic Club Femenino
Segunda Federación (women) clubs
Primera Federación (women) clubs